is a former Japanese football player.

Playing career
Shibakoya was born in Sendai on June 16, 1983. After graduating from high school, he joined J2 League club Oita Trinita in 2002. Although Trinita won the champions in 2002 season and was promoted to J1 League, he could not play at all in the match until 2003. In 2004, he was loaned to J2 club Mito HollyHock. He became a regular center back. In 2005, he returned to Trinita. Although he played many matches as center back in 2005, he could hardly play in the match from 2006. In April 2007, he moved to J2 club Sagan Tosu on loan. He played many matches as regular center back in 2 seasons. In 2009, he moved to J2 club Ehime FC on loan and played many matches. In 2010, he returned to Trinita which was relegated to J2 from 2010. However he could hardly play in the match. In September 2010, he moved to Indonesia and played for Pelita Jaya and Persiwa Wamena. He retired end of 2011–12 season.

Club statistics

Honours

Club honors
Oita Trinita
J2 League (1): 2002

References

External links

1983 births
Living people
Association football people from Miyagi Prefecture
Japanese footballers
J1 League players
J2 League players
Oita Trinita players
Mito HollyHock players
Sagan Tosu players
Ehime FC players
Expatriate footballers in Indonesia
Liga 1 (Indonesia) players
Pelita Bandung Raya players
Association football defenders